Adrián Martínez Flores (born 7 January 1970) is a Mexican former footballer who last played as a goalkeeper for Irapuato FC.

He previously played for San Luis F.C. in the Primera División (First Division).

He was capped by the Mexico national football team on four occasions, making his debut in 2000 and playing his last game in 2002.

He retired from professional football in 2011 after being relegated to the Irapuato bench.

Honours
Irapuato
Liga de Ascenso: Clausura 2011

References

1970 births
Living people
Footballers from Mexico City
Association football goalkeepers
Mexico international footballers
Liga MX players
Footballers at the 2011 Pan American Games
Santos Laguna footballers
Club Necaxa footballers
San Luis F.C. players
Club León footballers
Irapuato F.C. footballers
2001 Copa América players
2002 CONCACAF Gold Cup players
Mexican footballers
Pan American Games competitors for Mexico